Poels is a Dutch toponymic surname, originally referring to a location near a pool or small lake. People with this name include:

 Jack Poels (born 1957), Dutch singer, guitarist and harmonica player
 Marijn Poels (born 1975), Dutch documentary filmmaker and international speaker
 Pat Poels (born c. 1968), American professional poker player
 Roy Poels (born 1972), Dutch judoka
 Twan Poels (born 1963), Dutch road bicycle racer
 Wout Poels (born 1987), Dutch road bicycle racer

See also
 Poel (disambiguation)
 Van der Poel

References

Dutch-language surnames
Surnames of Dutch origin
Surnames of Belgian origin
Toponymic surnames